Richard Mead, FRS, FRCP, (11 August 1673 – 16 February 1754) was an English physician. His work, A Short Discourse concerning Pestilential Contagion, and the Method to be used to prevent it (1720), was of historic importance in the understanding of transmissible diseases.

Life
The eleventh of thirteen children of Matthew Mead (1630–1699), an Independent minister, Richard was born at Stepney, London. He studied at Utrecht for three years under JG Graevius. Having decided to follow the medical profession, he then went to Leiden and attended the lectures of Paul Hermann and Archibald Pitcairne. In 1695 he graduated in philosophy and physic at Padua, and in 1696 he returned to London, entering at once on a successful practice.

His Mechanical Account of Poisons appeared in 1702, and, in 1703, he was admitted to the Royal Society, to whose Transactions he contributed in that year a paper on the parasitic nature of scabies. In the same year, he was elected physician to St. Thomas' Hospital, and appointed to read anatomical lectures at the Surgeon's Hall. On the death of John Radcliffe in 1714, Mead became the recognised head of his profession; he attended Queen Anne on her deathbed, and in 1727 was appointed physician to George II, having previously served him in that capacity when he was prince of Wales.

While in the service of the king, Mead got involved in the creation of a new charity, the Foundling Hospital, both as a founding governor and as an advisor on all things medical. The Foundling Hospital was a home for abandoned children rather than a medical hospital, but it is said that through Dr. Mead's involvement, the Foundling was equipped with both a sick room and a pharmacy. He is even supposed to have influenced the architect, Theodore Jacobsen, into incorporating a large courtyard to promote the children exercising. A full-size portrait of Dr Mead, donated by the artist Allan Ramsay in 1747, ensures that his contribution will not be forgotten, and is permanently displayed at the Foundling Museum.

Mead was also a Fellow of the Royal Society, a Fellow of the College of Physicians and a Freemason (although it is not known to which lodge he belonged).

Mead was a collector of paintings, rare books, classical sculpture, gems and zoological specimens, which he made available for study at the library in his Bloomsbury house. His collection consisted of 10,000 volumes. In 1752 he received a letter from Camillo Paderni, concerning the progress at the excavations of the Villa of the Papyri. After his death, it took 56 days to auction them to book collectors from England and abroad. His "Genuine and Entire Collection of Valuable Gems, Bronzes, Marble and other Busts and Antiquities" was auctioned by Abraham Langford at his house in the Great Piazza, Covent Garden on 11-15 March 1755.

Mead's country estate was at Old Windsor in Berkshire, but he died at his house in Bloomsbury in 1754. His London home later formed the basis of Great Ormond Street Hospital.

Mead was buried in Temple Church. A monument to him was placed in the north aisle of the nave of Westminster Abbey, with a bust by Peter Scheemakers.

Religious views
In 1755 was published (posthumously) Mead's Medica Sacra; Or, A commentary on the most remarkable diseases, mentioned in the Holy Scriptures. He made use of the work of his relative Joseph Mede's Doctrine of Demons and also of his once patient Isaac Newton's Chronology to argue that pagan ideas regarding demons had entered Christianity. Like Arthur Ashley Sykes and others, Mead understood those afflicted by demons in the New Testament to refer simply to those suffering from a variety of illnesses:

Yet, Verses 28-34, in the  Gospel of Mathew, Chapter 8, specifically state that Jesus was spoken to by the 'demon', disproving its inanimateness; it personified itself by telling Jesus that his name was "Legion", and asked Him to relocate him into the nearby pigs. Jesus replied "Go", and after entering them Mathew records they then ran over the mountainside.

Possible foibles
Mead is satirised in Laurence Sterne's novel, Tristram Shandy, where he briefly appears as Dr Kunastrokius:  "—Did not Dr. Kunastrokius, that great man, at his leisure hours, take the greatest delight imaginable in combing of asses' tails, and plucking the dead hairs out with his teeth, though he had tweezers always in his pocket?" The name Kunastrokius is clearly a sexual pun, perhaps referencing Voltaire's Cunegund of Candide (1759). One of Sterne's correspondents later complained that he was reviving widespread rumours that Mead had gone bankrupt due to paying for elaborate sexual favours. Sterne defended himself on the grounds that all he did was "most distantly hint at a droll foible in his character...known before by every chamber-maid and footman within the bills of mortality".

Works

Besides the Mechanical Account of Poisons (2nd ed, 1708), Mead published:
a treatise De Imperio Solis ac Lunae in Corpora humana, & Morbis inde oriundis (On the Influence of the Sun and Moon upon Human Bodies and the Diseases Arising Therefrom) (1704)
A Short Discourse concerning Pestilential Contagion, and the Method to be used to prevent it (1720)
De variolis et morbillis dissertatio (1747)
Medica sacra, sive de morbis insignioribus qui in bibliis memorantur commentarius (1748)
On the Scurvy (1749) 
Monita et praecepta medica . Grund & Holle, Hamburgi 1752 Digital edition by the University and State Library Düsseldorf
 Life of Mead by Dr Matthew Maty appeared in 1755.
 Pharmacopoeia [Pharmacopoea] Meadiana : faithfully gathered from original Prescriptions, containing the most elegant Methods of Cure in Diseases ; to which are annexed useful Observations upon each Prescription ; the whole digested under proper Heads . Hinton, London 1756 Digital edition by the University and State Library Düsseldorf

References

Sources

External links

 
 
 
 

English astrologers
1673 births
1754 deaths
17th-century English medical doctors
18th-century English medical doctors
University of Padua alumni
Medical doctors from London
People from Old Windsor
People from Stepney
Fellows of the Royal Society
Collectors from London